Iceland's first ambassador to Yugoslavia was Helgi P. Briem in 1953. Iceland's last ambassador to Yugoslavia was Þórður Einarsson in 1991.

List of ambassadors

See also
Foreign relations of Iceland
Ambassadors of Iceland

References
List of Icelandic representatives (Icelandic Foreign Ministry website) 

1953 establishments in Iceland
1991 disestablishments in Iceland
Main
Yugoslavia
Iceland